A bioindicator is any species (an indicator species) or group of species whose function, population, or status can reveal the qualitative status of the environment. The most common indicator species are animals. For example, copepods and other small water crustaceans that are present in many water bodies can be monitored for changes (biochemical, physiological, or behavioural) that may indicate a problem within their ecosystem. Bioindicators can tell us about the cumulative effects of different pollutants in the ecosystem and about how long a problem may have been present, which physical and chemical testing cannot.

A biological monitor or biomonitor is an organism that provides quantitative information on the quality of the environment around it. Therefore, a good biomonitor will indicate the presence of the pollutant and can also be used in an attempt to provide additional information about the amount and intensity of the exposure.

A biological indicator is also the name given to a process for assessing the sterility of an environment through the use of resistant microorganism strains (e.g. Bacillus or Geobacillus). Biological indicators can be described as the introduction of a highly resistant microorganisms to a given environment before sterilization, tests are conducted to measure the effectiveness of the sterilization processes. As biological indicators use highly resistant microorganisms, any sterilization process that renders them inactive will have also killed off more common, weaker pathogens.

Overview
A bioindicator is an organism or biological response that reveals the presence of pollutants by the occurrence of typical symptoms or measurable responses and is, therefore, more qualitative. 
These organisms (or communities of organisms) can be used to deliver information on alterations in the environment or the quantity of environmental pollutants by changing in one of the following ways: physiologically, chemically or behaviourally.  
The information can be deduced through the study of:

 their content of certain elements or compounds
 their morphological or cellular structure
 metabolic biochemical processes
 behaviour
 population structure(s).

The importance and relevance of biomonitors, rather than man-made equipment, are justified by the observation that the best indicator of the status of a species or system is itself. Bioindicators can reveal indirect biotic effects of pollutants when many physical or chemical measurements cannot. Through bioindicators, scientists need to observe only the single indicating species to check on the environment rather than monitor the whole community. Small sets of indicator species can also be used to predict species richness for multiple taxonomic groups.

The use of a biomonitor is described as biological monitoring and is the use of the properties of an organism to obtain information on certain aspects of the biosphere. Biomonitoring of air pollutants can be passive or active. Experts use passive methods to observe plants growing naturally within the area of interest. Active methods are used to detect the presence of air pollutants by placing test plants of known response and genotype into the study area.

The use of a biomonitor is described as biological monitoring. This refers to the measurement of specific properties of an organism to obtain information on the surrounding physical and chemical environment.

Bioaccumulative indicators are frequently regarded as biomonitors. Depending on the organism selected and their use, there are several types of bioindicators.

Use 
In most instances, baseline data for biotic conditions within a pre-determined reference site are collected. Reference sites must be characterized by little to no outside disturbance (e.g. anthropogenic disturbances, land use change, invasive species). The biotic conditions of a specific indicator species are measured within both the reference site and the study region over time. Data collected from the study region are compared against similar data collected from the reference site in order to infer the relative environmental health or integrity of the study region.

An important limitation of bioindicators in general is that they have been reported as inaccurate when applied to geographically and environmentally diverse regions. As a result, researchers who use bioindicators need to consistently ensure that each set of indices is relevant within the environmental conditions they plan to monitor.

Plant and fungal indicators

The presence or absence of certain plant or other vegetative life in an ecosystem can provide important clues about the health of the environment: environmental preservation. There are several types of plant biomonitors, including mosses, lichens, tree bark, bark pockets, tree rings, and leaves. Fungi too may be useful as indicators.

Lichens are organisms comprising both fungi and algae. They are found on rocks and tree trunks, and they respond to environmental changes in forests, including changes in forest structure – conservation biology, air quality, and climate. The disappearance of lichens in a forest may indicate environmental stresses, such as high levels of sulfur dioxide, sulfur-based pollutants, and nitrogen oxides.
The composition and total biomass of algal species in aquatic systems serve as an important metric for organic water pollution and nutrient loading such as nitrogen and phosphorus.
There are genetically engineered organisms that can respond to toxicity levels in the environment; e.g., a type of genetically engineered grass that grows a different colour if there are toxins in the soil.

Animal indicators and toxins

Changes in animal populations, whether increases or decreases, can indicate pollution. For example, if pollution causes depletion of a plant, animal species that depend on that plant will experience population decline. Conversely, overpopulation may be opportunistic growth of a species in response to loss of other species in an ecosystem. On the other hand, stress-induced sub-lethal effects can be manifested in animal physiology, morphology, and behaviour of individuals long before responses are expressed and observed at the population level. Such sub-lethal responses can be very useful as "early warning signals" to predict how populations will further respond.

Pollution and other stress agents can be monitored by measuring any of several variables in animals: the concentration of toxins in animal tissues; the rate at which deformities arise in animal populations; behaviour in the field or in the laboratory; and by assessing changes in individual physiology.

Frogs and toads
Amphibians, particularly anurans (frogs and toads), are increasingly used as bioindicators of contaminant accumulation in pollution studies. Anurans absorb toxic chemicals through their skin and their larval gill membranes and are sensitive to alterations in their environment. They have a poor ability to detoxify pesticides that are absorbed, inhaled, or ingested by eating contaminated food. This allows residues, especially of organochlorine pesticides, to accumulate in their systems. They also have permeable skin that can easily absorb toxic chemicals, making them a model organism for assessing the effects of environmental factors that may cause the declines of the amphibian population. These factors allow them to be used as bioindicator organisms to follow changes in their habitats and in ecotoxicological studies due to humans increasing demands on the environment.

Knowledge and control of environmental agents is essential for sustaining the health of ecosystems.  Anurans are increasingly utilized as bioindicator organisms in pollution studies, such as studying the effects of agricultural pesticides on the environment.  Environmental assessment to study the environment in which they live is performed by analyzing their abundance in the area as well as assessing their locomotive ability and any abnormal morphological changes, which are deformities and abnormalities in development.  Decline of anurans and malformations could also suggest increased exposure to ultra-violet light and parasites. Expansive application of agrochemicals such as glyphosate have been shown to have harmful effects on frog populations throughout their lifecycle due to run off of these agrochemicals into the water systems these species live and their proximity to human development.

Pond-breeding anurans are especially sensitive to pollution because of their complex life cycles, which could consist of terrestrial and aquatic living. During their embryonic development, morphological and behavioral alterations are the effects most frequently cited in connection with chemical exposures. Effects of exposure may result in shorter body length, lower body mass and malformations of limbs or other organs. The slow development, late morphological change, and small metamorph size result in increased risk of mortality and exposure to predation.

Crustaceans
Crayfish have also been hypothesized as being suitable bioindicators, under the appropriate conditions.

Microbial indicators

Chemical pollutants

Microorganisms can be used as indicators of aquatic or terrestrial ecosystem health. Found in large quantities, microorganisms are easier to sample than other organisms. Some microorganisms will produce new proteins, called stress proteins, when exposed to contaminants such as cadmium and benzene. These stress proteins can be used as an early warning system to detect changes in levels of pollution.

In oil and gas exploration
Microbial Prospecting for oil and gas (MPOG) is often used to identify prospective areas for oil and gas occurrences. In many cases, oil and gas is known to seep toward the surface as a hydrocarbon reservoir will usually leak or have leaked towards the surface through buoyancy forces overcoming sealing pressures. These hydrocarbons can alter the chemical and microbial occurrences found in the near-surface soils or can be picked up directly. Techniques used for MPOG include DNA analysis, simple bug counts after culturing a soil sample in a hydrocarbon-based medium or by looking at the consumption of hydrocarbon gases in a culture cell.

Microalgae in water quality
Microalgae have gained attention in recent years due to several reasons including their greater sensitivity to pollutants than many other organisms. In addition, they occur abundantly in nature, they are an essential component in very many food webs, they are easy to culture and to use in assays and there are few if any ethical issues involved in their use.

Euglena gracilis is a motile, freshwater, photosynthetic flagellate. Although Euglena is rather tolerant to acidity, it responds rapidly and sensitively to environmental stresses such as heavy metals or inorganic and organic compounds. Typical responses are the inhibition of movement and a change of orientation parameters. Moreover, this organism is very easy to handle and grow, making it a very useful tool for eco-toxicological assessments. One very useful particularity of this organism is gravitactic orientation, which is very sensitive to pollutants. The gravireceptors are impaired by pollutants such as heavy metals and organic or inorganic compounds. Therefore, the presence of such substances is associated with random movement of the cells in the water column. For short-term tests, gravitactic orientation of E. gracilis is very sensitive.
Other species such as Paramecium biaurelia (see Paramecium aurelia) also use gravitactic orientation.

Automatic bioassay is possible, using the flagellate Euglena gracilis in a device which measures their motility at different dilutions of the possibly polluted water sample, to determine the EC50 (the concentration of sample which affects 50 percent of organisms) and the G-value (lowest dilution factor at which no-significant toxic effect can be measured).

Macroinvertebrates

Macroinvertebrates are useful and convenient indicators of the ecological health of water bodies and terrestrial ecosystems. They are almost always present, and are easy to sample and identify. This is largely due to the fact that most macro-invertebrates are visible to the naked eye, they typically have a short life-cycle (often the length of a single season) and are generally sedentary. Pre-existing river conditions such as river type and flow will affect macro invertebrate assemblages and so various methods and indices will be appropriate for specific stream types and within specific eco-regions. While some benthic macroinvertebrates are highly tolerant to various types of water pollution, others are not. Changes in population size and species type in specific study regions indicate the physical and chemical state of streams and rivers. Tolerance values are commonly used to assess water pollution and environmental degradation, such as human activities (e.g. selective logging and wildfires) in tropical forests.

Benthic indicators for water quality testing 
Benthic macroinvertebrates are found within the benthic zone of a stream or river. They consist of aquatic insects, crustaceans, worms and mollusks that live in the vegetation and stream beds of rivers. Macroinvertebrate species can be found in nearly every stream and river, except in some of the world's harshest environments. They also can be found in mostly any size of stream or river, prohibiting only those that dry up within a short timeframe. This makes the beneficial for many studies because they can be found in regions where stream beds are too shallow to support larger species such as fish. Benthic indicators are often used to measure the biological components of fresh water streams and rivers. In general, if the biological functioning of a stream is considered to be in good standing, then it is assumed that the chemical and physical components of the stream are also in good condition. Benthic indicators are the most frequently used water quality test within the United States. While benthic indicators should not be used to track the origins of stressors in rivers and streams, they can provide background on the types of sources that are often associated with the observed stressors.

Global context 
In Europe, the Water Framework Directive (WFD) went into effect on October 23, 2000. It requires all EU member states to show that all surface and groundwater bodies are in good status. The WFD  requires member states to implement monitoring systems to estimate the integrity of biological stream components for specific sub-surface water categories. This requirement increased the incidence of biometrics applied to ascertain stream health in Europe A remote online biomonitoring system was designed in 2006. It is based on bivalve molluscs and the exchange of real-time data between a remote intelligent device in the field (able to work for more than 1 year without in-situ human intervention) and a data centre designed to capture, process and distribute the web information derived from the data. The technique relates bivalve behaviour, specifically shell gaping activity, to water quality changes. This technology has been successfully used for the assessment of coastal water quality in various countries (France, Spain, Norway, Russia, Svalbard (Ny-Ålesund) and New Caledonia).

In the United States, the Environmental Protection Agency (EPA) published Rapid Bioassessment Protocols, in 1999, based on measuring macroinvertebrates, as well as periphyton and fish for assessment of water quality.

In South Africa, the Southern African Scoring System (SASS) method is based on benthic macroinvertebrates, and is used for the assessment of water quality in South African rivers. The SASS aquatic biomonitoring tool has been refined over the past 30 years and is now on the fifth version (SASS5) in accordance with the ISO/IEC 17025 protocol. The SASS5 method is used by the South African Department of Water Affairs as a standard method for River Health Assessment, which feeds the national River Health Programme and the national Rivers Database.

The imposex phenomenon in the dog conch species of sea snail leads to the abnormal development of a penis in females, but does not cause sterility. Because of this, the species has been suggested as a good indicator of pollution with organic man-made tin compounds in Malaysian ports.

See also

Biological integrity
Biological monitoring working party (a measurement procedure)
Biosignature
Ecological indicator
Environmental indicator
Indicator value
MERMOZ (remote detection of lifeforms)
Sentinel species

References

Herek, J. S., Vargas, L., Trindade, S. A. R., Rutkoski, C. F., Macagnan, N., Hartmann, P. A., & Hartmann, M. T. (2020). Can environmental concentrations of glyphosate affect survival and cause malformation in amphibians? Effects from a glyphosate-based herbicide on Physalaemus cuvieri and P. gracilis (Anura: Leptodactylidae). Environmental Science and Pollution Research, 27(18), 22619–22630. https://doi.org/10.1007/s11356-020-08869-z

Further reading

External links

Environmental Biomarkers Initiative at Pacific Northwest National Laboratory – U.S. Department of Energy, Richland, WA
Volunteer Monitoring Program – U.S. EPA
The National River Health Programme – South Africa
Pyxine cocoes Nyl. – A Foliose Lichen as a Potential Bio-indicator/Bio-monitor of Air Pollution in Philippines: An Update by Isidro A. T. Savillo
Biological Indicators for Sterilization – Protak Scientific

 
Ecology
Ecotoxicology
Measurement of biodiversity
Water quality indicators
Water pollution
Indicators